Freeport Football Club is a football club from Liberia based on the Bushrod Island in Montserrado County. The club plays in the LFA First Division.

History

Early History
The club was founded on March 14, 2011 and started playing in the Liberia Football Association Logan town sub-committee third division league and became champions of the Logan town sub-committee third division in 2015. In 2017, the club won the Liberia Football Association Montserrado County Sub-Association third division championship and got promoted to the Liberia Football Association second division league.

Promotion To The Top Tier
The club gained promotion to the top tier of Liberian football after spending just a year in the second tier. They finished third in on the 2019 Liberia Football Association second division table and got promoted to the Liberia Football Association first division along with FC Bea Mountain. The club played in the Liberian top tier for the first time during the 2019-20 LFA First Division. The club became title contenders in their debut year as they challenged for the top of the league table and reached the last eight of the Liberian FA Cup before the season got canceled due to the Coronavirus pandemic. They were sixth on the league table before the cancellation of the league.

Current squad

Technical Staff

References

Football clubs in Liberia
Sport in Monrovia